Lonestar is an American country music band founded in 1992 by Richie McDonald, John Rich, Keech Rainwater, Michael Britt and Dean Sams. The band has released 12 studio albums, five compilation albums, and 35 singles. Lonestar's first five releases for BNA Records are all certified Gold or higher by the RIAA, and their 2003 greatest hits album is certified Platinum. The band's highest-certified album is 1999's Lonely Grill at 3× Platinum. A ninth album, Party Heard Around the World, was released in April 2010. This was also the only album to feature lead singer Cody Collins, who replaced served as lead vocalist from 2008 to 2011.

Lonestar has also charted 35 songs on the Billboard Hot Country Songs charts. Nine reached No. 1 on the Billboard country singles charts: "No News", "Come Cryin' to Me", "Amazed", "Smile", "What About Now", "Tell Her", "I'm Already There", "My Front Porch Looking In" and "Mr. Mom". "Amazed", the longest-lasting at eight weeks, was the No. 1 country song of 1999 according to the Billboard Year-End charts. It also became the first song to top the country singles charts and Billboard Hot 100 charts since Dolly Parton and Kenny Rogers' "Islands in the Stream" in 1983. All of the band's No. 1 hits except "No News" have also been Top 40 hits on the Billboard Hot 100, as have "Not a Day Goes By" and "Let's Be Us Again", which respectively reached No. 3 and No. 4 on the country charts. Both "Amazed" and "I'm Already There" reached No. 2 on the Hot Adult Contemporary Tracks charts, and the former was a No. 21 on the UK Singles Chart. "Amazed", "I'm Already There", "My Front Porch Looking In" and "Mr. Mom" are all certified as gold singles by the RIAA.

Studio albums

Compilation albums

Extended plays

Singles

1990s

2000s

2010s

As a featured artist

Other charted songs
The following songs charted on the Hot Country Songs charts from unsolicited airplay.

Music videos

Notes

References

Country music discographies
 
 
Discographies of American artists